Morcott railway station is a former station in Rutland, near the village of Morcott.

Parliamentary approval was gained in 1846 by the directors of the London and Birmingham Railway for a branch from Rugby to the Syston and Peterborough Railway near Stamford. In the same year the company became part of the London and North Western Railway.

The line opened in 1851 but Morcott was not opened until 1898.  To gain a more direct route the LNWR had built a line from Seaton Junction to Yarwell junction near Wansford on its Northampton to Peterborough line, in 1879, thus bypassing the section to Luffenham railway station. Although it was now of little importance, it remained double and Morcott Station was built as a double line station with two platforms. The station buildings and platforms were of timber construction and there was a footbridge.

A siding was provided with loading docks for both horses and carriages. Oddly this could only be accessed from the Luffenham line and it was initially controlled by ground frame.  Some time later a crossover from the other line was added along with a signal box. The train service was around five passenger trains per day, with very few freight trains.

In 1907 the section was singled when the second platform, waiting-room, footbridge and signal box were all removed.  Entrance lines to the siding are provided for each direction from the single line, with facing point locks.

At grouping in 1923 it became part of the London Midland and Scottish Railway.

Freight services finished on 4 May 1964 and passenger on 6 June 1966.

References

External links
 Morcott's railway

Disused railway stations in Rutland
Former London and North Western Railway stations
Railway stations in Great Britain opened in 1898
Railway stations in Great Britain closed in 1966
Beeching closures in England